Putnam's Monthly Magazine of American Literature, Science and Art was a monthly periodical published by G. P. Putnam's Sons featuring American literature and articles on science, art, and politics.

Series
The magazine had three incarnations. Ten semiannual volumes of six issues were published from 1853 to 1857 (vols. 1–10) and six from 1868 to 1870 (vols. 1–6, second series). Cornell University Library numbers them consecutively, vols. 1–16. The 1906–1910 version restarts numbering at Volume 1.

1853–1857 
First, it was edited by Charles Frederick Briggs from January 1853 to September 1857 (whereupon it merged with Emerson's United States Magazine); It was founded by George Palmer Putnam, who intended it to be a vehicle for publishing the best of new American writing; a circular that Putnam sent to prospective authors (including Herman Melville) announced that the magazine would be 'as essentially an organ of American thought as possible'.  Putnam saw an opportunity to create a magazine that would compete with the successful Harper's New Monthly Magazine, which drew much of its content from British periodicals. As publishing only American writing would distinguish Putnam's from  Harper's and give the former unique status in the marketplace, Ezra Greenspan has argued that the magazine's literary nationalism was ‘a shrewd mixture of ideological altruism and publishing acumen’.  Frederick Law Olmsted served as its editor in its final two years.

1868–1870 

Edited by C. F. Briggs, Edmund Clarence Stedman and Parke Godwin from January 1868 to November 1870, whereupon it merged with Scribner's Monthly.

1906–1910 

The 1853 Putnam's Magazine was revived as Putnam's Monthly and merged with The Critic, which started publication in 1881 (or 1884?), and had been issued by Putnam's since 1898. The name of the merged publication was Putnam's Monthly and the Critic.

It was edited by Jeannette Gilder and Joseph Gilder from October 1906 to April 1910, when it merged with the Atlantic Monthly.

References

External links
 
 Putnam’s Magazine at Cornell University Library "Making of America", vols. 1–16 (1853–1870) – originally vols. 1–10 and vols. 1–6, second series
 Putnam's Magazine at HathiTrust Digital Library, vols. 1–7 (1906–1910)
 The Critic at The Online Books Page

The Atlantic (magazine)
Monthly magazines published in the United States
Cultural magazines published in the United States
Defunct literary magazines published in the United States
Magazines established in 1853
Magazines disestablished in 1910
Magazines disestablished in 1857
Magazines established in 1868
Magazines disestablished in 1870
Magazines established in 1906
Magazines published in New York City
1853 establishments in New York (state)